This is a list of comics featuring James Bond.

English

James Bond Jr.
Comic adaptation by Marvel based on the animated television serial.
 1992 #1 The Beginning!
 The Eiffel Missile!
 Earth-cracker!
 Plunder Down Under!
 Dance of the Toreadors!
 original story The Gilt Complex
 Sure as Eggs is Eggs!
 Wave Goodbye to the USA!
 Absolute Zero!
 Friends like these!
 Indian Summer!
 Homeward bound!

Junior James Bond Secret Agent 005.
A series of comics mostly in Hindi published in India in the Eighties by the now defunct Chitra Bharthi Kathamala. English titles include:
 Thief with a Difference
 International Killer
 Road to the Jail!
 Back to the Jail!
 The Killers!
 The Traitors
 A Band of Robbers

Compilation
The James Bond 007 Annual
 6 comic stories, 1965.
 6 comic stories, 1967.
 Live and Let Die (from novel) 1968.

Swedish
These comics were all published by Semic Press.

Spanish
These were all published by Zig Zag.
 Based on Risico (1968) Operation Risk
 The Hildebrand Rarity
 For Your Eyes Only
 original Le Chiffre story, Deadly Gold
 Gold for Le Chiffre
 (1969) Ultra Secret
 original Le Chiffre story Child's Play
 Casino Royale
 Based on "From A View to a Kill Hunting
 first chapter of "Goldfinger novel Mission in Mexico
 Gold and Death
 Relentless pursuit
 Based on Goldfinger novel Fatal Crossroad
 Based on Goldfinger novel The Gold of Fort Knox
 Berlin Intrigue
 Holiday for a Spy
 The Crime at the Discothèque
 Based on novel "Moonraker Sabotage
 Deadly Safari
 Doctor No
 A Beauty in Distress
 From Russia With Love
 Diamonds are Forever
 The C.I.P.E.T. affair
 The Crows
 The Missing Pilot
 Sacrilege
 start of Thunderball SPECTRE
 The Queen of the Bees
 Intrigue in the Arctic
 (1970) The Silk Cord
 The Hand of Fate
 Based on Thunderball Operation Thunder
 Based on Live and Let Die To Live and to Let Die
 Doubles
 The Beach of Flowers
 The Spy Who Loved Me
 Based on On Her Majesty's Secret Service The Arch-Criminal
 On Her Majesty's Secret Service
 You Only Live Twice
 The Man with the Golden Gun
 Death is amused
 The Executioner
 Bait
 Cry of Freedom
 Danger at Dock 4
 The Prince and the Dragon
 A Warm Summer Afternoon
 Bodyguard
 5 degrees below zero
 The Saboteurs
 A Pleasure Trip
 Mercenaries
 Inferno in Sicily
 Yeti
 The Golden Dolphin
 (1971) The Rally of Death
 Mystery on TV
 The Condemned

Japanese
Before creating Golgo 13, manga artist Takao Saito drew a serial based on the 007 series that was published monthly in Shogakukan's Boy's Life magazine from December 1964 to August 1967. The manga adapted four of Ian Fleming's original novels and were subsequently republished in collected editions under Shogakukan's Golden Comics imprint during serialization. The collected editions were later reprinted in 1981 under the Shogakukan Bunko imprint, and in 2015 under the Big Comics Special imprint.

Dutch
 Anthology Comic – Doctor No
 Semic – Codename: Nemesis
 The Slave Traders
 Operation: Burma
 Liquidate Bond
 Operation: Little
 The Mad Emperor
 Operation Jungle Devils
 Operation: UFO
 Loempea – Licence To Kill (1989)

Hungarian
These comics were all published by Nyomdai.
 Operation Jungle Devils
 Operation: Blücher
 Codename: Romeo
 The Green Death
 Death in Tahiti
 Chinese Puzzle

Satire comics
 Blitz Weasel Studios — The Blonde Avenger, March 1996
 Cottonwood Graphics — Rick O'Shay, Hipshot and Me, 1990
 DC Comics
 L.E.G.I.O.N. 94 Annual
 Animaniacs
 Diamond Comics
 Deathmask
  The Mystery of Box
 Dark Horse Comics — Light of My Death
 Marvel Comics
 Laff and Let Die
 Live And Let Spy
 Studio Chikara — The Barbi Twins Ashcan
 Topps Comics — The Barbi Twins Adventures
 NOW Comics — Married With Children
 Play Value Books 
 Storm Bringer
 Blackclaw's Doomsday Plot
 The James Bond 007 Fan Club — The Illustrated James Bond, 007
 Titan Books
 The Golden Ghost
 Till Death Do Us Part
 The Phoenix Project
 Trouble Spot
 Shark Bait
 Death Wing
 Paradise Plot

In humour magazines
Mad magazine
 #94 April 1965 007 – A MAD Musical
 #165 March 1974 8 "James Bomb" Bomb Movies: Dr No-No, From Russia With Lunacy, Goldfinger Bowl, Thunderblahh, You Only Live Nice, On His Majesty's Secret Shamus, Dollars are Forever, Live and Let Suffer
 #199 Jun 1978 The Spy Who Glubbed Me
 #213 March 1980 $00 Moneyraker
 #229 March 1982 For Her Thighs Only
 #248 July 1984 Remington Steal: Pierce Brosnan before Bond
 #340 Oct/November 1995 If James Bond Were Updated for the Correct '90s: Pierce Brosnan as the new, PC Bond.
 #365 Jan. 1998 James Bond Villains' Pet Peeves
 #521 June 2013 Casebook "Skyfail" The Battle of the Bonds
Mad Super Special
 #27 1978 "James Bomb" (reprint)
Cracked magazine
  The Beatles meet James Bond
  1977 The spy who snubbed me
  1979 Moonwrecker
  A Cracked look at 007
 #306 March 1996 007-Plasticeye
 Collectors edition April 2000 007's Latest Supercool Spy Gadgets
 #342 March 2002, "The World is Not Enough"

See also
 Outline of James Bond

Notes

Sources
 007 Magazine, Issue 34, 1998
 The Bond Files, Andy Lane and Paul Simpson
 Comic Book Checklist & Price Guide 2007: 1961 to Present, Maggie Thompson
 mi6-hq.com, "The Home of James Bond 007"

comics